The Memorial Hall Museum is a museum dedicated to preserving the history of the Deerfield, Massachusetts region as well as New England generally. It is overseen by the Pocumtuck Valley Memorial Association. The museum's collection of furnishings, paintings, textiles, and Indian artifacts is housed in a 1798 building. The museum opened in 1880.

Antecedents 
What is now the building Memorial  Hall originally was the home of the Deerfield Academy, and was built in 1798. It was designed by architect Asher Benjamin, and remained the home of the Deerfield Academy until 1878. From the founding of the Academy the building was designed to contain a museum, making it one of the oldest museums in the United States. The early collection consisted primarily of geological specimens and "curiosities" that would assist in educating pupils at the Deerfield Academy, but it also included memorabilia donated by the descendants of Reverend John Williams, who was taken as a captive to Canada following the 1704 Deerfield Massacre.

Founding 
In 1870, George Sheldon, preservationist and antiquarian, founded the Pocumtuck Valley Memorial Association, a regional historical society, and served as its first president. For ten years, he located and preserved historical papers, books, and artifacts. After the Deerfield Academy was given land and money to build a new building in 1876 and moved to that building in 1878, the Pocumtuck Valley Memorial Association took over Memorial Hall and enhanced its collection with items collected by George Sheldon. Three rooms were created that represented life in Colonial America. It was the first US museum to create a permanent period room. The museum opened to the public in 1880.

Collection 
The Pocumtuck Valley Memorial Association manages the museum, which preserves the history of Deerfield and New England more generally. Its collection includes furnishings, paintings, textiles, and Indian artifacts. The museum contains the Indian House Door, a souvenir of the great Native American and French raid on Deerfield. An old inscription next to the door describes how the “stout door kept at bay the French and Indians,” and its “hatchet hewn face still tells the tale of that fateful night.” 

While in close proximity to the buildings of Historic Deerfield, Memorial Hall is a separate institution.

References

External links

Deerfield, Massachusetts
History museums in Massachusetts
Museums in Franklin County, Massachusetts
National Register of Historic Places in Franklin County, Massachusetts